"Club Foot" is a song by English indie rock band Kasabian, featured on their 2004 debut album, Kasabian. It was released on 10 May 2004 in the UK. The video of this song, directed by W.I.Z., is dedicated to Czech student Jan Palach who in 1969 set himself on fire in protest against renewed Soviet suppression of Czechoslovakia. The video also refers to the Soviet government's intervention in the Hungarian Revolution of 1956 on a banner showing the text in Hungarian (Szabad Európa Rádió), which translates as "Radio Free Europe/Radio Liberty". The scene with the inspector girl who stands before the tank harks back to the young man who stood in front of the line of tanks in 1989 in Tiananmen Square, which itself has become an icon for resistance.

In October 2011, NME placed it at number 108 on its list "150 Best Tracks of the Past 15 Years".

Background 

Bassist Chris Edwards said, "It's about love and life. At the time [in 2002] , the war in Iraq had just kicked off and the lyrics aren't about pushing you in one way or another, but just about what was going on at the time, what you'd read in the paper about soldiers being petrol bombed."

Guitarist Serge Pizzorno said the song is about "revenge and having it out."

Composition 
The song is known for its distinctive distorted bass riff, played by lead guitarist Christopher Karloff as opposed to primary bassist Chris Edwards. Karloff would also play the bassline live, while Edwards played guitar. After Karloff's departure from the band in 2006, touring guitarist Jay Mehler would play the bassline, but from 2008 onwards Edwards has played the bassline in live performances.

Serge Pizzorno said, "We were watching a Beach Boys documentary and saw they had a great kind of approach to making 'Good Vibrations.' We wanted to approach 'Club Foot' the same way, to mess with the landscape and give the listener something to hold on to."

MTV.com described the song as "a quilt of relentless beats, hissing electronic noises, a buzzing guitar riff and Meighan's breathless, menacing vocals." The Morning Call said it "piles layers and layers of synths atop tight guitar work before coming to a fluttering, flutey end."

Track listing

CD
PARADISE08

 Club Foot – 2:52
 Club Foot (Jagz Kooner Vocal Mix) – 4:53
 Trash Can – 2:53
 Sand Clit – 3:53

Personnel
 Tom Meighan – lead vocals
 Sergio Pizzorno – guitar, synths, backing vocals
 Christopher Karloff – guitar, bass, synths, drum machine

Reissue

"Club Foot" is a reissued single from Kasabian. The single entered the Uk Chart at No. 19 in 2004, and at No. 21 in 2005. In 2005 it also peaked No. 27 in US Modern Rock Tracks, the same position in the same chart reached in 2011 with the single version contained in Live!, recorded at The O2 Arena in London on 15 December 2011. The Maxi CD includes two new B-sides and a remix of "Club Foot", while the 2-track CD contains a live version of non-album track "55".

Track listing

Maxi CD
PARADISE30
 Club Foot – 2:51
 The Duke – 3:35
 Bang – 3:05
 Club Foot (Jimmy Douglass Remix) – 3:21
 CD-rom with Club Foot promo video + Club Foot Live @ Brixton Academy video

Mini CD
PARADISE29
 Club Foot – 2:51
 55 (Live @ Brixton Academy) – 4:23

10" Vinyl
PARADISE31
 Club Foot – 2:51
 55 (Live @ Brixton Academy) – 4:23
 Club Foot (Jimmy Douglass Remix) – 3:21

Australian EP
82876659622
 Club Foot – 2:51
 Reason Is Treason – 3:44
 Trash Can – 2:53
[Notes: Red Digipak]

Charts

Certifications

References

External links
 
 

2004 singles
2005 singles
Kasabian songs
2004 songs
Songs written by Sergio Pizzorno
Columbia Records singles
Song recordings produced by Jim Abbiss
Songs written by Christopher Karloff